is a railway station in the city of  Shinshiro, Aichi Prefecture, Japan, operated by Central Japan Railway Company (JR Tōkai).

Lines
Kakidaira Station is served by the Iida Line, and is located 42.9 kilometers from the starting point of the line at Toyohashi Station.

Station layout
The station has one side platform serving a single bi-directional track. There is no station building, but only a small shelter on the platform. The station is unattended.

Adjacent stations

|-
!colspan=5|Central Japan Railway Company

Station history
Kakidaira Station was established on May 5, 1923, as Kakidaira Signal on the now-defunct . On August 1, 1943, The Horaiji Railway and the Sanshin Railway were nationalized along with some other local lines to form the Japanese Government Railways (JGR) Iida Line. Kakidaira was elevated to a full station on February 15, 1950. Along with its division and privatization of JNR on April 1, 1987, the station came under the control and operation of the Central Japan Railway Company.

Surrounding area
The station is located in a rural area.

See also
 List of Railway Stations in Japan

References

External links

Railway stations in Japan opened in 1950
Railway stations in Aichi Prefecture
Iida Line
Stations of Central Japan Railway Company
Shinshiro, Aichi